The Language Integrator is a mutoscope intended to be used only by inhabitants of the 82nd century upon the opening of the Crypt of Civilization time capsule. This was a machine invented by the project archivist Thomas Kimmwood Peters to teach English to the people of the future that open the time vault.

Operation 
The apparatus is an invention of Thomas Kimmwood Peters, formerly a photography professional, and is part of the assembly of objects preserved in the Crypt of Civilization time capsule vault that was built between 1937 and 1940 at the Oglethorpe University in Brookhaven, Georgia, in Metro Atlanta. The machine is intended to be used to allow the denizens of the 82nd century that open the crypt in 8113 A.D to decipher 20th-century English. There will be a noticeable arrow pointing at it and symbols and numbers that indicate its purpose and encourage those that have entered the crypt to use it. When the crank is first turned by an operator it will begin with each letter of the alphabet pronounced so that the person can hear how it is to be spoken. After all the letters have been presented then a sequence of thousands of names paired with symbols of objects will be given and pronounced in English. The picture shown and the pronunciation of it are synchronized in the device to make the relationship clear. The idea behind this apparatus is that it will act as a speaking Rosetta Stone to enable translation between a 20th-century language and an 82nd-century language.

Construction 
Peters obtained a mutoscope slide-show motion picture projector and modified it.  He replaced the gears and bearings with rustproof ones and connected it to a hand-cranked phonograph player. When the crank is turned, a non-corrosive metal sheet within the device displays a picture of an object and the name of the object shown is given by a voice in English from a metal phonograph record.

References

Oglethorpe University
time capsules
1938 in Georgia (U.S. state)
1939 in Georgia (U.S. state)
1940 in Georgia (U.S. state)
Film and video technology
History of film